Chaudhary Charan Singh University (CCS University), formerly Meerut University, is a public state university located in Meerut, Uttar Pradesh, India. The university was established in 1965. It was later renamed to its current name after Chaudhary Charan Singh, former Prime minister of India. The university celebrated its silver jubilee in 1991.

Notable alumni

Mayawati, Chief minister of Uttar Pradesh politician
Bipin Rawat, General, Chief of Defence Staff (CDS) 
 Sushil Kumar, wrestler
 K. C. Tyagi, Indian politician
 Kamal Davar, Indian Army officer, first Director General of the Defence Intelligence Agency
 Arun Govil, film actor
 Jai Verma, Nottingham-based poet and advocate of Hindi language and culture
 Alka Tomar, wrestler
 Satyadev Prasad, archer
 Divya Kakran, wrestler
 Rajeev Kumar Varshney, Agricultural scientist
 Karim Uddin Barbhuiya, businessman and politician
 Rakesh Tikait, national spokesperson of the Bharatiya Kisan Union
 Sanjeev Tyagi, film and television actor

References

External links
 

 
Universities and colleges in Meerut
Universities in Uttar Pradesh
Memorials to Chaudhary Charan Singh
Educational institutions established in 1965
1965 establishments in Uttar Pradesh